Gugudan, also stylized as gu9udan or gx9, was a South Korean girl group formed in 2016 by Jellyfish Entertainment and the company's first girl group. The group debuted on June 28, 2016, with their EP Act. 1 The Little Mermaid. The group was composed of eight members: Mimi, Hana, Haebin, Nayoung, Sejeong, Sally, Soyee and Mina.  Originally a nine-piece group, Hyeyeon left the group in October 2018.

Following two years with no group activities, Gugudan disbanded on December 31, 2020.

History

Pre-debut
In January 2016, Nayoung, Sejeong and Mina were introduced as Jellyfish Entertainment's first female trainees on the Mnet survival show, Produce 101, where 101 female trainees from various companies competed to debut in an eleven-member girl group that would promote for a year under YMC Entertainment. After placing 2nd and 9th respectively in the final episode, Sejeong and Mina debuted as members of I.O.I in May 2016.

2016: Debut with Act. 1 The Little Mermaid

Despite denying earlier reports of Sejeong and Mina debuting in a 3-member girl group in June, Jellyfish Entertainment confirmed on June 7 that the two I.O.I members would debut within the month in what would be the company's first girl group. Because of YMC Entertainment's special terms in which I.O.I's members are allowed to do activities under their respective companies while I.O.I was on break or while the group promoted in sub-units, there were no complications with the plan.

Nayoung was also confirmed as a member on June 10 and on June 13, Jellyfish Entertainment revealed that Gugudan would be a nine-member group. On June 17, Jellyfish Entertainment announced the group name.

On June 22, the group confirmed that they were going for a "mermaid" concept. Following the announcement, a highlight medley of the group's debut mini-album was released on June 24. They debuted on June 28, 2016, with the mini-album, Act. 1 The Little Mermaid, with "Wonderland" as the title song. Their debut showcase was held at the Yes24 Live Hall on the same day as the album's release.

Gugudan participated in Jellyfish Entertainment's annual winter project, Jelly Christmas 2016, with their label mates Seo In-guk, VIXX, Park Yoon-ha, Park Jung-ah, Kim Gyu-sun, Kim Ye-won and Jiyul. The title track, "Falling" was released digitally on December 13, 2016.

2017: Act. 2 Narcissus and Act. 3 Chococo Factory
Their second mini-album, Act. 2 Narcissus, and its title track, "A Girl Like Me", was released on February 27.

On November 8, the group released a single album, Act. 3 Chococo Factory, featuring the title track, "Chococo". Prior to the release, it was announced that Soyee will go on hiatus in order to fully recover from a shoulder injury that she had since prior to her debut.

2018: Act. 4 Cait Sith, Act. 5 New Action, Japanese debut and Hyeyeon's departure

On February 1, Gugudan released their second single album Act. 4 Cait Sith, with the lead single "The Boots".

On May 17, it was announced that youngest member Hyeyeon would go on a temporary hiatus from all the group activities due to health issues.

Gugudan officially debuted in Japan with a release of their first Japanese single Stand By on September 19. On September 21, Gugudan held their debut showcase and fanmeeting titled Gugudan 1st Showcase ＆ Fanmeeting "Dear Friend" in Japan at Tokyo Akasaka Blitz. The group also held their first Japan tour in Osaka and Tokyo starting on December 7, 2018.

Hyeyeon left the group for personal reasons in October 2018.

On November 6, Gugudan released their third EP, Act. 5 New Action, containing six tracks with the lead single "Not That Type".

2020: Sally's participation in Produce Camp 2020 and disbandment
Chinese member Sally participated in the Chinese version of survival show Produce 101, Produce Camp 2020, in April. The survival show concluded with Sally ranking sixth, making her a member of the temporary girl group BonBon Girls 303.

On December 30, Gugudan had announced their disbandment. Their final schedule was completed on December 31, 2020. Jellyfish also announced that all of the members would stay with the company.

2021: Members' departure from Jellyfish Entertainment
On March 31, 2021, Soyee and Mimi announced on their individual social media accounts that their contracts with Jellyfish Entertainment had expired and they decided not to renew. On April 1, 2021, Nayoung announced through her social media account that she also decided not to renew her contract followed by Haebin's announcement on April 7, 2021. On April 30, 2021, group leader, Hana, officially announced that she left Jellyfish Entertainment. On May 11, 2021, Sejeong renewed her contract with Jellyfish Entertainment as a solo artist and actress.

Past members
 Mimi — Sub-vocal
 Hana — Leader, main dancer, sub-vocal
 Haebin — Main vocal
 Nayoung — Lead vocal
 Sejeong — Main vocal
 Sally — Lead dancer, lead rapper, sub-vocal
 Soyee — Main vocal
 Mina — Main rapper, main dancer, sub-vocal
 Hyeyeon — Lead dancer, vocalist, rapper

Subunits

Gugudan 5959
In July 2017, Jellyfish Entertainment formed the subunit group named Gugudan 5959 (spelled as "Ogu-ogu"), composed of the youngest members Mina and Hyeyeon. The "5959" name is made up of their represented numbers in Gugudan: Hyeyeon representing the number 5 and Mina representing the number 9. 5959 released their debut single, "Ice Chu", on August 10, 2017.

After Hyeyeon's departure in October 2018, the subunit consequently became inactive.

Gugudan SeMiNa

In June 2018, Jellyfish Entertainment formed the second subunit of Gugudan, composed of members Sejeong, Mina and Nayoung, named Gugudan SeMiNa. The "SeMiNa" name is made up of the first syllables of the members' names. Gugudan SeMiNa debuted with the release of their self-titled single album consisting of two tracks on July 10, 2018.

Discography

Single albums

Extended plays

Singles

Collaborations

Soundtrack appearances

Videography

Music videos

Filmography

Television
Gugudan Project: Extreme School Trip (MBC Music; 2016)

Web Show
What Are Gugudan Doing? (vLive & YouTube; 2016–2020)

Concert and tours
Gugudan 1st Showcase ＆ Fanmeeting "Dear Friend" in Japan (2018)
Gugudan 1st Japan Tour "Play" (2018)
Gugudan “1st Asia Tour” (2018)

Awards and nominations

Notes

References

External links

 

 

 
Jellyfish Entertainment artists
K-pop music groups
Musical groups established in 2016
Musical groups disestablished in 2020
South Korean girl groups
South Korean pop music groups
South Korean dance music groups
Musical groups from Seoul
2016 establishments in South Korea
2020 disestablishments in South Korea